"Old Devil Moon" is a popular song composed by Burton Lane with lyrics by Yip Harburg for the 1947 musical Finian's Rainbow. It was introduced by Ella Logan and Donald Richards in the Broadway show. The song takes its title from a phrase in "Fun to Be Fooled", a song that Harburg wrote with Harold Arlen and Ira Gershwin for the 1934 musical Life Begins at 8:40. 

In the 1968 film version, the song was performed by Don Francks and Petula Clark.

Notable recordings
  
Margaret Whiting - her single release reached the No. 11 spot in the Billboard charts in 1947.
Gene Krupa and His Orchestra (vocal by Carolyn Grey) - this also reached the Billboard charts briefly in 1947 in the No. 21 position.
Miles Davis  – Blue Haze (1954)
Sarah Vaughan - a single release (1954).
Mickey Baker (1955)
Jack Pleis, His Piano, Orchestra and Chorus – Broadway Goes Hollywood (1955)
Bob Dorough - Devil May Care (1956)
Frank Sinatra - Songs for Swingin' Lovers (1956)
Jay Jay Johnson - Jay (1956)
Andrew Hill Trio – So in Love (1956)
Morton Gould & His Orchestra - Blues in the Night (1957)
Sonny Rollins - A Night at the Village Vanguard (1957)
Anita O'Day - Anita Sings the Most (1957)
Jimmy Smith - Plays Pretty Just for You (1957)
Chet Baker - (Chet Baker Sings) It Could Happen to You (1958)
Totlyn Jackson [with Lance Hayward] - Lance Hayward at the Half Moon (1958), Jamaica Jazz 1931-1962
Lurlean Hunter - Stepping Out (1958)
Peggy Lee - Jump for Joy (1958)
Judy Garland - That's Entertainment (1960)
Mel Torme – Mel Tormé Swings Shubert Alley (1960)
McCoy Tyner Trio - Reaching Fourth (1962)

References

External links
SoundCloud performance by the late Piero Cusato

1947 songs
Carmen McRae songs
Frank Sinatra songs
Lena Horne songs
Songs from musicals
Songs with lyrics by Yip Harburg
Songs with music by Burton Lane